František Dřížďal (born 8 August 1978 in Sokolov) is a former Czech football player.

In 2008 Dřížďal was voted "Revelation of the Year" at the Golden Ball awards.

Footnotes

References

 Guardian Football

1978 births
Living people
People from Sokolov
Czech footballers
Czech First League players
FK Baník Sokolov players
SK Slavia Prague players
FC Zbrojovka Brno players
Association football defenders
Sportspeople from the Karlovy Vary Region